Lee Seul-bi (born April 24, 1991), also known by her ex-stage name Ga Won, is a South Korean actress.

Filmography

Films

Television series

References

External links 
 Lee Seul-bi at Wid May Entertainment 
 
 
 

1991 births
Living people
South Korean child actresses
South Korean television actresses
South Korean film actresses